The 2005 London Marathon was the 25th running of the annual marathon race in London, United Kingdom, which took place on Sunday, 17 April. The elite men's race was won by Kenya's Martin Lel in a time of 2:07:26 hours and the women's race was won by home athlete Paula Radcliffe in 2:17:42.

In the wheelchair races, Mexico's Saúl Mendoza (1:35:51) and Italy's Francesca Porcellato (1:57:00) won the men's and women's divisions, respectively.

Around 132,000 people applied to enter the race: 47,969 had their applications accepted and 35,600 started the race. A total of 35,261 runners, 24,690 men and 10,571 women, finished the race.

Results

Men

Women

Wheelchair men

Wheelchair women

References

Results
Men's results. Association of Road Racing Statisticians. Retrieved 2020-04-18.
Women's results. Association of Road Racing Statisticians. Retrieved 2020-04-18.

External links

Official website

2005
London Marathon
Marathon
London Marathon